Aleksandr Vladimirovich Tretyakov (born 1 October 1972 in Perm, Soviet Union) is a Russian wrestler who won bronze medal at the 1996 Summer Olympics.

References

External links
 

1972 births
Russian male sport wrestlers
Wrestlers at the 1996 Summer Olympics
Olympic wrestlers of Russia
Medalists at the 1996 Summer Olympics
Olympic medalists in wrestling
Olympic bronze medalists for Russia
Sportspeople from Perm, Russia
Living people